Zulejka Stefanini (6 January 1912 – 27 March 2005) was a Yugoslav hurdler. She competed in the women's 80 metres hurdles at the 1936 Summer Olympics.

References

1912 births
2005 deaths
Athletes (track and field) at the 1936 Summer Olympics
Yugoslav female hurdlers
Croatian female hurdlers
Olympic athletes of Yugoslavia
Sportspeople from Split, Croatia
People from the Kingdom of Dalmatia
Burials at Mirogoj Cemetery